There was a nominal total of 12 quota places available (in parasport events only) for cycling at the 2022 Commonwealth Games; 6 each for men and women.

Rules
The top five Commonwealth Games Associations (CGAs) in each of the UCI Individual Tandem B – Track Para Rankings qualify one athlete each; however, if fewer than five CGAs make the top fifteen outright, the CGA with the highest-ranked second athlete also receives a second quota place. The last place in each gender group is reserved for a Bipartite Invitation.

All those who qualify must be accompanied by a pilot for the competition, which has no impact on quota allocation.

Timeline

Events
Men's para-track

Women's para-track

References

Cycling at the 2022 Commonwealth Games
Commonwealth Games
Commonwealth Games
Qualification for the 2022 Commonwealth Games